Count Władysław Krasiński (1844–1873) was a Polish nobleman, landowner, lawyer and historian.

Władysław was the 3rd Ordynat of the Opinogóra estates. He was the son of one of Poland's greatest romantic poets Zygmunt Krasiński.

During the January Uprising he worked in Paris together with Prince Władysław Czartoryski. He was passionate in the humanities and organized the ordination collections. He founded the Library of ord. Krasińscy, initiated the publishing house Library of ord. In 1868. Krasińscy published together with Władysław Chomętowski the first five volumes.

He was married to Róża Potocka and had three children, Adam Krasiński, Elżbieta Maria Krasińska and Zofia Krasińska.

References

1844 births
1873 deaths
Counts of Poland
Wladyslaw